Tembi may refer to:

Villages in Iran 
Tembior Tombi may refer to:
 Tembi, Khuzestan
 Tombi Golgir, Khuzestan Province
 Tembi, Masjed Soleyman, Khuzestan Province
 Tombi, Kohgiluyeh and Boyer-Ahmad

Other uses 
 Kingdom of Tembi, a historic kingdom in Mozambique (see History of Maputo)

See also
 Vale of Tempe